Wu Den-yih (born 30 January 1948) is a Taiwanese politician. He graduated from National Taiwan University and worked as a journalist before beginning a career in politics with a 1973 appointment to the Taipei City Council. Wu was then elected Magistrate of Nantou County, serving from 1981 to 1989. Following two terms as magistrate, he was named Mayor of Kaohsiung in 1990. Wu remained mayor until 1998, having won the office in a 1994 direct election. He then served two full terms in the Legislative Yuan from 2002 to 2008. Shortly after winning a third term in the legislature, Wu was named Premier of the Republic of China in 2009. He served until 2012, when he and Ma Ying-jeou formed the Kuomintang (KMT) presidential ticket. Wu served one four-year term as Vice President of the Republic of China, stepping down in 2016. In May 2017, he was elected party chairman. Wu stepped down from the position in January 2020. Previously, Wu had served the KMT as secretary-general from 2007 to 2009, first vice chairman in 2014, and as acting chairman in 2014 and 2015.

Early life
Wu was born in Caotun, Taichung, Taiwan in 1948. He attended National Taiwan University, where he was president and editor-in-chief of the University News (大學新聞) student periodical in from 1968 to 1969. One of the essays Wu wrote for the publication prompted Chiang Ching-kuo to support Wu's entry into politics. He graduated with a Bachelor of Arts degree in history in 1970. Upon graduation, he was conscripted into the military.

Early career
Upon completing his compulsory military service in the armed forces, Wu worked as a journalist for the China Times before entering starting his political career. While with the China Times, he was known for his accurate reporting and insightful commentary.

Early political career
In 1973 at the age of 25, he was appointed to a position in the Taipei City Council, serving as the youngest member of the council. While in the office, he was resolute in upholding the view of working with high standard of integrity. For some corrupt officials, he asserted that bending the law is even worse than the corruption itself. He further added that although corruption violates the law, the law nevertheless survives. But if one publicly manipulates the law with impunity, the law dies. Wu worked for the council for eight years. During his time in the council, he also still worked as an editorial writer at China Times providing his opinions and thoughts on current political issues.

After serving the Taipei City Council, Wu made a successful campaign for the magistracy of Nantou County. He was elected to two terms, serving from 1981 to 1989.

He was named Mayor of Kaohsiung in 1990. Wu was directly elected to a second term in office, but lost reelection to Frank Hsieh in 1998. In 2001, Wu was elected to the Legislative Yuan for the first time, winning reelection twice thereafter, in 2004 and 2008.

KMT Secretary-General
From 2007 to 2009, Wu was the secretary-general of the Kuomintang.

2009 mainland China visit
In May 2009, Wu left for mainland China for an 8-day visit. He was accompanied by three senior KMT members, Wu Po-hsiung, Lin Fong-cheng and John Chiang. Wang Yi, Director of Taiwan Affairs Office welcomed the delegations upon arrival in Beijing.

The delegations visited several cities. In Beijing, they visited the Guangdong-Guangxi House, where Sun Yat-sen was elected as Chairperson of Kuomintang in 1912. In Hangzhou, they visited the Manao Temple, where a museum of Lian Heng is located. In Nanjing, they visited Sun Yat-sen Mausoleum. And in Chongqing, they attended the Taiwan Week celebration organized by Taiwanese businessmen doing business in mainland China.

ROC Premiership

Premiership appointment
Wu was designated to succeed Liu Chao-shiuan as Premier of the Republic of China on 8 September 2009 by President Ma Ying-jeou. Liu and his Cabinet resigned en masse on 10 September to take responsibility for damage caused by Typhoon Morakot, with Wu succeeding the post the same day. Wu was appointed to the position due to his rich party and administrative experience. Wu spent his first night as Premier in Kaohsiung where he visited the Typhoon Morakot survivors at their temporary shelters in the Republic of China Military Academy in Fengshan District.

2012 ROC Presidential Election

On 19 June 2011, Ma Ying-jeou announced that he and Wu would form the Kuomintang ticket for the 2012 presidential election, as incumbent Vice President Vincent Siew chose not to stand for reelection. Ma and Wu won the election with 51.6% of the vote, and took their respective offices on 20 May 2012.

2012 Boao Forum for Asia

On 1–2 April 2012, ROC Vice President-elect Wu, in his capacity as the top advisor of the Cross-Straits Common Market Foundation, attended the 2012 Boao Forum for Asia in Haikou, Hainan. Wu represented Taiwan as "China's Taiwan" during the forum. In the forum, Wu met with PRC Vice Premier Li Keqiang in which both of them agreed to address various of cross-strait issues. While touring to a fruit farm during the forum period, Wu said that he will take care of the Chinese companies doing business in Taiwan. He added that he will make every effort in assisting any Chinese people who wish to invest in Taiwan.

ROC Vice Presidency

Taiwanese fisherman shooting incident

After the shooting incident of Taiwanese fisherman by Philippine government vessel on 9 May 2013 at the disputed water in South China Sea, speaking at a seminar in Longtan, Wu hoped that Taiwan and the Philippines can settle their maritime territorial dispute, and wished that all parties involved can work together to achieve the East China Sea peace initiative proposed by President Ma Ying-jeou in August 2012 to jointly explore and develop the resources in the sea area because this continuing dispute hinder the development of the sea resources.

KMT Chairmanship
On 9 January 2017, Wu announced his candidacy for the 2017 KMT chairmanship election at the National Taiwan University Hospital International Convention Center in an event attended by former and current KMT legislators. He was the third person, after Hau Lung-pin and incumbent chairperson Hung Hsiu-chu, to announce his candidacy for the position. Wu won the election on 20 May, and received a congratulatory letter from Communist Party of China General Secretary Xi Jinping. Wu responded by emphasizing the 1992 Consensus and expressed his intention to create peace across the Taiwan Strait.

Following Han Kuo-yu's loss in the 2020 Taiwanese presidential election, Wu resigned from the Kuomintang chairmanship on 15 January 2020.

Cross-strait relations
Speaking in October 2016, Wu said that both sides of the Taiwan Strait should engage in a healthy competition, build its society better and give more contribution for the building up of a strong and prosperous Chinese nation. He said that Mainland China's ambition for reunifying Taiwan under one country, two systems and Taiwan's ambition for independence or unification would destabilize cross-strait relations, stressing that peace is the best choice for both sides of the strait at the moment.

Personal life
Wu is married to Tsai Ling-yi. They have three sons and one daughter.

References

External links

 

|-

|-

|-

|-

|-

|-

1948 births
Kuomintang Members of the Legislative Yuan in Taiwan
Living people
Magistrates of Nantou County
Mayors of Kaohsiung
Members of the 5th Legislative Yuan
Members of the 6th Legislative Yuan
Members of the 7th Legislative Yuan
Nantou County Members of the Legislative Yuan
Premiers of the Republic of China on Taiwan
Taiwanese people of Hoklo descent
Vice presidents of the Republic of China on Taiwan
Chairpersons of the Kuomintang
Taipei City Councilors
Recipients of the Order of Chiang Chung-Cheng